This is a list of women writers who were born in Switzerland or whose writings are closely associated with that country.

B
Elisabeth Baumgartner (1889–1957), Swiss author of play is Bernese German dialect
Béatrix Beck (1914–2008), Swiss-born Belgian writing in French, novelist
Maja Beutler (1936–2021), German-language novelist, short story writer, playwright
S. Corinna Bille (1912–1979), short story writer, poet, novelist, children's writer
Teresina Bontempi (1883–1968), Italian-language Swiss journalist, editor
Irena Brežná (born 1950), Slovak-Swiss writer, journalist, activist
Erika Burkart (1922–2010), German language poet, short story writer, novelist
Martha Burkhardt (1874–1958), Swiss-born travel writer

C
Dominique Caillat (born 1956), playwright, non-fiction writer, works in German, French and English
Corinne Chaponnière (born 1954), Swiss-Canadian writer
Anne Cuneo (1936–2015), French-language novelist, journalist, screenwriter
Suzanne Curchod (1737–1794), French-language non-fiction writer, salonist

D
Laurence Deonna (born 1937), journalist, writer and photographer specializing in the Middle-East

E
Isabelle Eberhardt (1877–1904), French-language journalist, travel writer
Marianne Ehrmann (1755–1795), early German-language novelist, journalist
Ruth Erat (born 1951), German-language narrative works

F
Marie-Louise von Franz (1915–1998), German-language psychologist, writings on symbolism

G
Valérie de Gasparin (1813–1894), French-language non-fiction writer
Marthe Gosteli (1917–2017), Swiss women's history archivist and suffrage writer
Emilie Gourd (1879–1946), French-language journalist, feminist
Anne-Lise Grobéty (1949–2010), French-language novelist, poet, young adults writer

H
Anita Hansemann (1962–2019), Late start writer, books and libretto play
Eveline Hasler (born 1933), German-language novelist, children's writer, essayist, playwright
Jeanne Hersch (1910–2000), French-language writings on philosophy, human rights

I
Mirjam Indermaur (born 1967), German-language non-fiction writer

J
Fleur Jaeggy (born 1940), Italian-language novelist
Zoë Jenny (born 1974), German-language novelist, widely translated
Hanna Johansen (born 1939), novelist, children's writer, translator

K
Isabelle Kaiser (1866–1925), poet, novelist, writing in both French and German
Agota Kristof (1935–2011), French-language novelist, poet, playwright
Christina Krüsi (born 1968), author of the autobiographical Paradise Was My Hell describing child abuse

L
 Monique Laederach (1938–2004), poet, novelist, translator

M
Ella Maillart (1903–1997), French-language travel writer
Janine Massard (born 1939), French-language novelist
Jane Marcet (1769–1858), English-language writings on science
Mariella Mehr (born 1947), German-language novelist
Isabelle de Montolieu (1751–1832), French-language novelist, translator
Hortensia von Moos (1659–1715), German-language writings on the status of women

N
Marguerite Naville (1852–1930), painter, photographer and diarist

P
Erica Pedretti (born 1930), German-language non-fiction writer, essayist, playwright
Amélie Plume (born 1943), novelist, playwright

R
Grisélidis Réal (1929–2005), sex worker, writer 
Alice Rivaz (1901–1998), French-language novelist, essayist, feminist
Noëlle Roger (1874–1953), French-language novelist
Annelise Rüegg (1879–1934), biographer, pacifist, communist

S
Isabelle Sbrissa (born 1971), poet, playwright
Anka Schmid (born 1961), screen writer, film director, video artist
Annemarie Schwarzenbach (1908–1942), German-language novelist, journalist, travel writer
Monique Schwitter (born 1972), short story writer, playwright, actress
Johanna Spyri (1827–1901), German-language children's writer, author of Heidi
Laurence Suhner (born 1968), French-language comic and short-story writer since 1984

U
Regina Ullmann (1884–1961), German-language poet

V
Aline Valangin (1889–1986), novelist, short story writer
Aglaja Veteranyi  (1962–2002), German-language novelist
Camille Vidart (1854–1930), women's rights activist, translated Heidi into French

W
Silja Walter (1919–2011), nun, German-language poet, religious writer

See also
List of women writers
List of German-language authors
List of French-language authors

References

Swiss
Writers
Writers, women